Edo black soup also known as omoebe is a Nigerian soup made mainly from three leaves namely scent leaf, uziza leaf and bitter leaf. Other ingredients include beef, onion, crayfish, pepper and palm oil.

Origin 
The Benin soup is popular in Edo State, although it can be taken by anyone in Nigeria.

Overview 
The meat is boiled with seasoning cubes and onion. while boiling, uziza leaf and scent leaf are blended together, with the bitter leaf blended separately.

In addition to adding  palm oil and the meat stock in a pot, grounded pepper, crayfish, onion and the blended uziza-scent vegetable are allowed to cook for 2–3 minutes. Also, the blended bitter leaf is added to the thickened soup.

Other foods 
Black soup is eaten with fufu, Eba, Pounded yam and Semovita.

See also 
 Nigeria cuisine
 Hanpen
 Japanese regional cuisine

References 

Nigerian cuisine
West African cuisine
Japanese cuisine
Surimi